This is a list of schools in County Dublin, listed by local authority.

Dublin

Primary schools
Kildare Place National School
Scoil Bhríde
St Declan's School, Dublin
St. Josephs BNS
St Mary's College, Dublin
St Michael's College, Dublin
Sutton Park School
St. Patrick's national girls school
St. Patrick's national boys school
Corpus Christi National girls school

Secondary schools

Dún Laoghaire–Rathdown

Primary schools
Dalkey School Project
Guardian Angels National School
Harold Boys National School Dalkey
Harold National School Glashule
Loreto Primary Dalkey
Our Lady's Grove Primary School
St. Kilian's Deutsche Schule
St. Raphaela's School
Scoil Lorcáin
Gaelscoil Laighean
Willow Park School

Secondary schools

Fingal

Primary schools
 Gaelscoil Bhaile Brigín, Balbriggan
Sacred Heart of Jesus, Huntstown
Pope John Paul II National School
St. Helens National School, Portmarnock

Secondary schools

South Dublin

Primary schools
Divine Word School
 Scoil Mhuire NS, Lucan
 Gaelscoil Eiscir Riada, Lucan
 Our Lady Queen of Apostles, Clonburris
Our Lady's Primary Schools
Scoil Aine Naofa, Lucan
Scoil Ide, Clondalkin
 Scoil Nano Nagle, Tallaght
St. Joseph's Boys National School
St. Pius X National School
St Thomas' JNS, Lucan 
 Talbot Senior National School, Clondalkin
St.Marys Boys National School,Lucan
Scoil Naomh Padraig, Ballyroan 
Lucan East Educate Together National School 
Griffeen Valley Educate Together National School
St. John the Evangelist National School 
 Adamstown Castle Educate Together National School  
 Scoil Mhuire Girls National School
 Divine Mercy National Schools 
 St. Anne's Primary School 
 St. Marks National School 
 Tallaght Community National School 
 St. Thomas's National School
 Cnoc Mhuire National School 
 Sacred Heart National School 
 St. Dominics National School 
 Scoil Santain 
 Holy Rosary Primary School
 Glenasmole National School 
 Firhouse Educate Together National School 
 Scoil Carmel National School 
 Gaelscoil Giúise 
 Scoil Treasa
 Scoil Maelruian National School 
 St. Martin De Porres National School 
 St. Mary's National School, Tallaght 
 Solas Chríost National School 
 Scoil Aoife 
 Gaelscoil Lir 
 Rathcoole Educate Together National School 
 St. Mary's National School,Saggart 
 Citywest Educate Together National School 
 Citywest and Saggart Community National School 
 Scoil Chrónáin 
 Holy Family National School 
 St. Finians National School 
 St. Martins National School

Secondary schools
Adamstown Community College
Ashfield College
The King's Hospital
Lucan Community College
Moyle Park College
Pobalscoil Iosolde
 Coláiste Cois Life
Rockbrook Park School
Templeogue College
Coláiste Chilliain
Deansrath Community College
 Kishoge Community College 
 St. Joseph's College, Lucan 
 Tallaght Community School 
 Coláiste De Híde 
 Firhouse Community College 
 Firhouse Educate Together Secondary School 
 Collinstown Park Community College 
 Griffeen Community College 
 Coláiste Phádraig 
 St. Marks Community School 
 Old Bawn Community School 
 Killinarden Community School 
 St.Aidans Community School
 Mount Seskin Community College 
 Holy Family Community School 
 St. Colmcilles Community School 
 Greenhills Community College 
 St. Paul's Secondary School 
 Coláiste Eanna

See also

List of schools in the Republic of Ireland

References

 
Dublin
Schools